Bivalve is an unincorporated community and census-designated place along the eastern shore of the lower Nanticoke River, near its mouth on the Chesapeake Bay, in Wicomico County, Maryland, United States. Its population was 201 as of the 2010 census. Bivalve takes its name from the oyster, upon which the town's economy once depended. It is part of the Salisbury, Maryland-Delaware Metropolitan Statistical Area.

The Yellow Brick House was listed on the National Register of Historic Places in 1978.

Demographics

References

External links
History of Bivalve

Fishing communities in Maryland
Census-designated places in Wicomico County, Maryland
Census-designated places in Maryland
Salisbury metropolitan area
Maryland populated places on the Chesapeake Bay